Bernard J. Flynn (February 10, 1888 – September 15, 1971) was an American attorney who served as the United States Attorney for the District of Maryland from 1934 to 1953.

References

1888 births
1971 deaths
United States Attorneys for the District of Maryland
Maryland Democrats